Ultraviolet is a Polish television series starring Marta Nieradkiewicz, Agata Kulesza and Sebastian Fabijański. The plot revolves around a thirty-year-old woman (Ola Serafin) who has to move back to her hometown of Łódź. After observing a suspicious incident one night, she decides to join a group of online amateur detectives who work on unsolved cases.

The first season premiered on 25 October 2017 on AXN. A second season was released on 2 October 2019. The theme song was written and performed by Wojtek Urbański and Justyna Święs. The first season was nominated for the Best TV CEE Series award at the Serial Killer festival.

Premise
The series begins when Aleksandra, a part-time Uber driver, witnesses the murder of a young woman. The police seem apathetic about the case, believing it to be a suicide. So she seeks help from a group of amateur investigators known as Ultraviolet (UV), so called because violet sees more than blue (meaning the police). The members of UV communicate though the internet and use computer related technology to obtain clues; each member having their own area of expertise. Aleksandra joins UV and the series follows her as she and UV solve crimes that the police are unable to handle. Meanwhile, the police actively try to restrict UV's activities.

Cast and characters
 Marta Nieradkiewicz as Aleksandra "Ola" Serafin-Łozińska
 Agata Kulesza as Anna Serafin
 Sebastian Fabijański as Michał Holender
 Bartłomiej Topa as Waldemar Kraszewski
 Viet Anh Do as Huan Nguyen "Piast Kołodziej"
 Karolina Chapko as Dorota Polańska
 Paulina Chapko as Regina Polańska
 Magdalena Czerwińska as Beata Misiak
 Marek Kalita as Henryk Bąk
 Michał Żurawski as Tomasz Molak
 Katarzyna Cynke as Grażyna Molak

Episodes

Season 1 (2017)

Season 2 (2019)

Release
Ultraviolet was released on 25 October 2017 on AXN.

References

External links
 
 

2010s Polish television series
Polish-language television shows
Television shows set in Poland
2017 Polish television series debuts